Scaeosopha is a genus of moths in the family Cosmopterigidae.

Species
mitescens species group
Scaeosopha chionoscia 
Scaeosopha convexa 
Scaeosopha dentivalvula 
Scaeosopha gibbosa 
Scaeosopha grandannulata 
Scaeosopha incantata 
Scaeosopha mitescens 
Scaeosopha nigrimarginata 
Scaeosopha rarimaculata 
Scaeosopha rotundivalvula H.H. Li, 2005
Scaeosopha sattleri H.H. Li, 2005
Scaeosopha trigonia 
Scaeosopha triocellata 
percnaula species group
Scaeosopha betrokensis 
Scaeosopha erecta 
Scaeosopha hongkongensis 
Scaeosopha minuta 
Scaeosopha nullivalvella 
Scaeosopha percnaula 
Scaeosopha pseusta 
Scaeosopha sabahensis 
Scaeosopha sinevi 
Scaeosopha spinivalvata 
Scaeosopha tuberculata 
Scaeosopha victoriensis 
unknown species group
Scaeosopha atrinervis

Former species
Scaeosopha albicellata Meyrick (now in Triclonella)
Scaeosopha citrocarpa Meyrick (now in Triclonella)

References

 , 2005: The genus Scaeosopha Meyrick new to China, with descriptions of two new species (Lepidoptera: Cosmopterigidae: Scaeosophinae). The Pan-Pacific Entomologist 80(1-4): 23-28.
 , 2012: Review of the genus Scaeosopha Meyrick, 1914 (Lepidoptera, Cosmopterigidae, Scaeosophinae) in the world, with descriptions of sixteen new species. Zootaxa, 3322: 1-34.

External links
Natural History Museum Lepidoptera genus database

Scaeosophinae